Pierrot the Clownfish is a French children's book by author Franck Le Calvez. A sequel from the same author, Pierrot the Clownfish: The Black Cloud, was published in 2009.

Disney lawsuit 
In 2003, Le Calvez filed suit against Pixar and its distribution company Walt Disney Pictures, claiming that the story and the characters from this book were plagiarized in the film Finding Nemo. The author and his lawyer, Pascal Kamina, demanded from Disney a share of the profits from merchandising articles sold in France. Le Calvez and Kamina lost the lawsuit on 12 March 2004 and intended to file an appeal on 5 October 2004; however, to date there has been no further action taken against Pixar on the matter. On 15 April 2021, The Film Theorists made a YouTube video believing that it was actually Le Calvez who had copied Disney. The book had been published roughly one year before the film's release, but as pointed out in the video, advertising for the film was already present by then and production on animated movies takes years, making it highly unlikely that Disney or Pixar had taken anything from Le Calvez.

References

External links
 
 

2002 children's books
Books involved in plagiarism controversies
Fictional fish
French children's books
French picture books